Hadson da Silva Nery (born 4 August 1981), known as Hadson or Hadballa, is a Brazilian professional football manager of Santos de Macapá, reality-television personality and former professional footballer.

Career
Born in Belém, Pará, Hadson began playing football in Corinthians' youth system. He began his professional career with Remo in 2000 and would play as a left back there until joining Paraná. Hadson began a two-year spell playing for Tavriya Simferopol in the Ukrainian Premier League in 2003.

Hadson returned to Brazil for one season with Ponte Preta before resuming his European career with Portuguese Liga side União Leiria and Segunda Liga club Gondomar. He resumed playing in Brazil enjoying spells with Paysandu and Pinheirense before joining Brasil de Pelotas in 2010.

After Hadson retired from playing football, he went into management of local club Bragantino Clube do Pará in 2014.

In 2020, he participated in the reality show Big Brother Brasil 20, as a civilian, being the third evicted from the program with 79,71% of votes against Felipe Prior (20,29%).

In 2021, Nery was hired to be manager of Grêmio Barueri, a former national topflight team, currently at the 4th division in the state of São Paulo. He got into agreement with Santos do Amapá but preferred to participate in Power Couple (Brazilian season 6).

Personal life

He is the younger brother of the fellow retired footballer Harison Nery.

References

 

1981 births
Living people
People from Belém
Brazilian footballers
Association football midfielders
Clube do Remo players
Paraná Clube players
SC Tavriya Simferopol players
U.D. Leiria players
Gondomar S.C. players
Paysandu Sport Club players
Ukrainian Premier League players
Brazilian expatriate footballers
Expatriate footballers in Ukraine
Brazilian expatriate sportspeople in Ukraine
Big Brother Brasil
Big Brother (franchise) contestants
Sportspeople from Belém